Meester is a surname. Notable people with the surname include:

Brad Meester (born 1977), American football player
Leighton Meester (born 1986), American actress, singer, songwriter and model

See also 
 Mester
Cooper v Die Meester, an important case in South African property law
Heartstrings (Leighton Meester album), is the debut studio album by American singer-songwriter Leighton Meester
Meester Kikker, is a 2016 Dutch family film directed by Anna van der Heide